Police Academy (also known as Police Academy: The Animated Series) is a 1988 animated television series based on the Police Academy series of films. The show was produced by Ruby-Spears Enterprises for Warner Bros. Animation. It aired weekdays and lasted two seasons for a total of 65 episodes.

Some episodes feature a crime boss named Kingpin. His keen intelligence, girth, and stature are very similar to the Marvel Comics character of the same name. Other new characters were added to the show as well. Among them were a group of talking police dogs called the Canine Corps. They were made up of Samson (the bulldog leader), Lobo (the noble yet clumsy husky), Bonehead (the dimwitted giant St. Bernard), Chilipepper (the excitable chihuahua), and Schitzy (the only female golden retriever with an identity crisis). The theme song is performed by the Fat Boys, who also make an appearance in two episodes as House's Friends: Big Boss, Cool and Mark. Robert Folk's theme for the movies is used, uncredited, over the closing credits.

The animated series was more popular in Europe, especially in Italy. It was especially popular in the Arab world, where it was broadcast on Spacetoon and Al Aoula. In Japan, the animated series was shown on TV Tokyo and then TV Asahi.

Synopsis 
The animated series takes place chronologically between the fourth and fifth films.

Thirteen characters are re-created for this animated version, including a team of Academy graduates led by Carey Mahoney, a likeable rogue bachelor boy, who unconsciously—and consistently—does his best to make life miserable for Captain Harris and his knucklehead assistant Sgt. Proctor.

Mahoney's friends include the aptly named Moses Hightower, sound effects master Larvell Jones, trigger-happy Eugene Tackleberry, sweet and timid Laverne Hooks, hardened Debbie Callahan, colossal House, and the duo of reformed gang member Zed McGlunk and his best buddy, Carl Sweetchuck.

Eric Lassard is the highly respected (albeit dreamy) Commandant, and Academy newcomer The Professor is also on hand, and also the cadets new friends, the K-9 Corps, a group of police dogs, and stocking the crime-fighting heroes with an endless supply of wacky gadgets as they combat a motley crew of Kingpin and other recurring villains such as Numbskull, The Claw, Mr. Sleaze, Lockjaw, and Amazona.

Characters 
 Cadet Carey Mahoney – The most clever among the officers. Mahoney is always ready to lend a hand to his companions. He is the patrol partner of Larvell Jones.
 Cadet Larvell Jones – Mahoney's usual sidekick. He is a martial arts master, but his main talent is beatboxing – he is able to imitate all manner of noises, including sirens, gunfire, helicopters, and so forth.
 Cadet Carl Sweetchuck – Sweetchuck is the most cowardly of the group. He is very accident prone and oblivious to the harm caused by his clumsiness. His patrol partner is Zed.
 Cadet Zed McGlunk – Zed is the messy and unkempt member of the group. Zed usually drags his partner along in his wily and erratic pursuits.
 Cadet Moses Hightower – Hightower is known for his great size and physical strength. His stature often comes into play when the characters find themselves in situations in which bars must be bent or walls need to smashed through. He is patrol partner with Laverne Hooks.
 Cadet Laverne Hooks – Hooks is small, soft-spoken, and passive. However, she has shown herself capable of being extremely forceful and loud in situations in which she is provoked.
 Cadet Thomas "House" Conklin – "House" is known for his large frame and his congenial nature. He is always hungry and proves himself to be cowardly. He patrols with Sweetchuck and Zed and often accompanies them in their escapades.
 Cadet Eugene Tackleberry – Characterized by a pronounced jaw and almost always wears sunglasses and helmet, Tackleberry is a weapons fanatic. He has a weakness for his fellow patrol Callahan. He often uses the armored car of the police which he usually wrecks. He is fond of using a bazooka.
 Sergeant Debbie Callahan – Is the statuesque beauty of the group who is extremely resilient and has a beautiful singing voice.
 Captain Thaddeus Harris – Always carries a walking stick and is almost always in the company of his sidekick Proctor. He often tries to humiliate the officers in order to gain a promotion, but fails miserably.
 Sergeant Carl Proctor – Is Capt. Harris' dim witted lieutenant.
 Captain Ernie Mauser - Is a captain and head of the K-9 corps. He became good friends with Mahoney and his gang. He acts similar to Hurst when facing up to Harris' shenanigans.
 Commandant Eric Lassard – The easygoing and idealistic commandant.
 Professor – He is the inventor of numerous devices.
 K-9 corps – They are trained dogs. They can talk, but only to themselves and other animals.

Other characters

Villains (criminals) 
 Kingpin – He is the largest of all the bandits of various episodes of the series, and together makes a great ceremony to the Council of Crime. He is a parody of Marvel Comic's Kingpin. He is drawn as overweight, bald and always wearing a white suit.
 Weasel and Wooley – Kingpin's henchman.
 Numbskull – A not-too-bright criminal who uses a trick helmet to bash through the walls of his robbery targets.
 Mr. Sleaze
 Claw
 Phoenix Amazona – A roller derby star turned thief.  She is a childhood friend of Callahan's.
 Lockjaw
 The Clown Gang
 The Phantom
 The London Bridge Gang
 The Phantom of the Opera
 George and Lenny
 Seedy McLeech
 Mr. Crameneil
 The Highway Robbers (Auntie Bertha and Cousins Ed and Ned)
 Madame Zelda and the Land Pirates
 Krantz
 The Magnificent Mystopholes
 Dr. Kamaleon
 Mr. Bimmelman
 Flung Hi
 The Hang Ten Gang
 Mr. Glitch and Cratchit
 Waxen Wayne
 Barracuda and his Diamond Gang
 Muggsy
 King Neptune
 Ace, Queen of Hearths and Chester
 Dr. Mackle, Miss Bomb and Marsupialman
 Falcon
 Big Sal
 Fox
 Mr. Watkips and Watso
 Lady Tina and Smalto
 Skull Ned and the Rock Gang
 Sheikh and the Guards
 The Incredible Shandar – A magician who uses reflective material to make his targets seem to disappear.
 Maxine
 Krutz and his gang
 The Mexican Gang
 Slik and his gang
 Pop Corn and Family
 Bad Knight and his Throttle Gang
 The Twin Humongo
 Professor Pilpers/Bates
 Jaguar
 Mr. Shee, Pork, Squitty and Fufy the crocodile
 Big Burger
 Mr. Ego and Charles
 Prof. Pherril and Pack
 Dr. Deadstone
 The Hillbilly Sheriff and Jack
 Noxo
 The Junkman John Lurid and Freker
 Mob Balsom
 Old Clyde Barrow, Bonnie and Butch
 Lidya and Pongo
 Schubert Von Schuters
 Robin Good – A parody of Robin Hood, who claims to give his stolen goods to the poor, but in fact he just keeps it.
 Tex and Mulgrew

Voice cast

Main 
 Ron Rubin as Sgt Carey Mahoney
 Dan Hennessey as Officer Zed McGlunk / Sgt Eugene "Tack" Tackleberry 
 Howard Morris as Officer Carl Sweetchuck / The Professor
 Greg Morton as Sgt Larvell Jones / Sgt Moses Hightower
 Len Carlson as Captain Thaddeus Harris
 Don Francks as Officer Thomas "House" Conklin / Lieutenant Carl Proctor
 Denise Pidgeon as Lieutenant Debbie Callahan / Sergeant Laverne Hooks
 Tedd Dillon as Commandant Eric Lassard

Additional 
 R. Nelson Brown as Elwin Bixby
 Dorian Joe Clark
 Anthony Correa
 Gary Crawford
 Catherine Gallant
 Charles W. Gray
 Rex Hagon as Captain Ernie Mauser
 Elizabeth Hanna
 Suzette Myers as Anchor
 Greg Swanson
 Frank Welker
 Noam Zylberman as Bobby / Bill

Crew 
 Howard Morris - Voice Director

In other languages 
 Italian: Scuola di polizia (Police School)
 Spanish: Loca academia de policía/locademia de policía (Crazy Police Academy)
 Hungarian: Rendőrakadémia (Police College)
 Lithuanian: Policijos akademija (Police Academy)
 Arabic: أكاديمية الشرطة (Police Academy)

Other media

Home video releases

VHS 
Police Academy was released through chronological volumes on VHS. At least 6 volumes were released, each including two episodes:

 1° The Good, the Bad, and the Bogus + Cops and Robots
 2° The Phantom of the Precinct + My Mummy Lies Over the Ocean
 3° Worth Her Weight Gold + Westward Ho Hooks
 4° Numbskull's Revenge + Mr. Sleaze Versus Lockjaw
 5° Proctor, Call a Doctor! + Puttin' on the Dogs
 6° Little Zed & Big Bertha + Lights, Action, Coppers

DVD 
On December 11, 2012, Warner Archive released Police Academy: The Animated Series - Volume 1 with 30 episodes on DVD in region 1. This is a Manufacture-on-Demand (MOD) release, available exclusively through Warner's online store and Amazon.com.

Action figures 
Kenner produced a line of Police Academy action figures based on the animated series. Each features multiple points of articulation and comical accessories. Two accessories, included with Claw and Eugene Tackleberry, would be reused for the Joker figures in Kenner's Dark Knight Collection. Five of the vehicles and playsets planned were left unproduced; however, the Copper Corner playset would later be released through the Argentinian company Josca.

Series 1 (1988) 
 Carey Mahoney and Samson Dog
 Claw with Mouser Cat
 Eugene Tackleberry with Armed Flak Vest
 Larvell Jones and Bullhorn
 Moses Hightower and Meter Reader Scooter
 Mr. Sleaze with Fodo Dog
 Numbskull with Smashing Helmets
 Zed and Police Skateboard

Series 2 (1988) 
 Captain Harris (mail-away)
 S.W.A.T. Eugene Tackleberry with Fistzooka
 Flung Hi with Crazy Karate Gear
 Kingpin with Thief-Trap Safe
 Karate Larvell Jones

Special Assignment Rookies (1989) 
 Undercover Carey Mahoney
 Snack Attack House with Hoagie Blaster
 Stakeout Sweetchuck (mail-away)
 Sky Glidin' Zed with Hang Glider

Vehicles and playsets (1988) 
 Crazy Cruiser
 Crash Cycle
 Precinct Police Station
 Copper Corner (released through Josco)

Comic books 
Based on the cartoon series, Marvel Comics released six issues of a comic book series that published under the main company's name but also featured a "Star Comics Present' byline on the spash page.

Outsourced production work 
 Hanna-Barbera
 Toei Animation

Stations

References

External links 
 STA: Police Academy (Kenner)
 

1988 American television series debuts
1989 American television series endings
1980s Canadian animated television series
1988 Canadian television series endings
1989 Canadian television series endings
Police Academy (franchise)
1980s American animated comedy television series
1980s American police comedy television series
Animated television shows based on films
Television series by Ruby-Spears
Television series by Warner Bros. Television Studios
First-run syndicated television programs in the United States
Action figures
1980s toys
English-language television shows
TV Asahi original programming
Animation based on real people
American children's animated comedy television series
Canadian children's animated comedy television series